Speranza quadrilinearia is a species of geometrid moth in the family Geometridae. It is found in Central America and North America.

The MONA or Hodges number for Speranza quadrilinearia is 6288.

References

Further reading

 

Macariini
Articles created by Qbugbot
Moths described in 1873